Kavita Kané (born 5 August 1966) is an Indian writer and former journalist. She is known for writing Mythology-fiction. All of her books are based on Indian mythology. Her bestselling novel is Karna's wife: the Outcast Queen'.  She is an author of the new era of retelling

Early life and education
Born in Mumbai, Kavita Kané grew up in other cities like Patna, Delhi and Pune. She is an alumna of Fergusson College, Pune and has completed her post graduation, both in English Literature and Mass Communication, from the University of Pune.  Although, initially, she wanted to be in the administrative services, she chose a career in journalism because she wanted to write and it was the only pragmatic career option for writing. She worked for 20 years in various media houses - Magna Publications, Daily News and Analysis and The Times of India. After the success of her debut novel, Karna's Wife, she opted to become a full time author.

Personal life
Her childhood was spent entirely in Patna, Delhi and Pune, with her parents and two sisters. She admits the best companions for all of them were not just each other - but books. 'My father has a personal collection of over 10,000 books and if you did not read, you were considered a freak!' A die-hard aficionado of cinema and theatre, her hobbies are limited to reading - and her family. Married to a mariner, Prakash Kane, she lives in Pune with two daughters, Kimaya and Amiya, and her other family of two dogs - Chic, the cocker spaniel and Cotton, the white, curious cat.

Bibliography
 The Karna's Wife: The Outcast's Queen (2013)
 Sita's Sister (2014) 
 Menaka's Choice (2015) 
 Lanka's Princess (2016) 
 The Fisher Queen’s Dynasty (2017) 
 Ahalya's Awakening'' (2019) 
 Saraswati's Gift (2021)

References

Women writers from Maharashtra
Writers from Mumbai
1966 births
Living people